The 19th Regiment Massachusetts Volunteer Infantry was an infantry regiment that served in the Union Army during the American Civil War.

Service history
The 19th Massachusetts was organized at Camp Schouler in Lynnfield, Massachusetts, in April 1861. The 19th was largely composed of Essex County men. Its core began as three companies of the state militia's 1st Battalion Massachusetts Rifles from Essex County.

Initial training

The three militia Rifle companies were Company A from West Newbury, B from Newburyport, and C from Rowley. Seven other companies were recruited. D, E, and I were recruited in Boston. F and G were men from Middlesex, Cambridge and Lowell respectively. Company H was recruited in Roxbury. The final, tenth company, Company K, was formed from the Tiger Fire Zouaves of Boston.

Men in the regiment were initially issued uniforms from the stocks of the dark-green militia rifle coats that would be replaced by the standard U.S. blue frock or sack coats that were issued just before the Peninsula Campaign in the spring of 1862. These stocks were soon depleted so that most of the companies other than the first three and last were without uniforms. Up until August 1, the regiment was slowly building up. The Commonwealth issued the new recruits either Model 1841 Mississippi rifles that had been upgraded with sights, bayonets, and new bores from the existing stocks within the Essex and Middlesex armories or Model 1842 Springfield smoothbore muskets from armories in Boston and Middlesex.

The regiment followed the standard structure of the three-year volunteer regiments of ten companies of 83-101 men (which could be split into two battalions on an ad hoc basis) and a field staff of 36-66. The officers were divided into field staff who ran the regiment and battalions and the line or company officers who ran the companies.

On August 1, the 19th received its colonel, Edward W. Hincks, and as its lieutenant colonel, Arthur F. Devereux. Both men had prior militia and federal experience. Colonel Hinks, originally from Maine, had moved from Bangor to Boston as a printer in 1849. By 1855, he had been a state legislator and a Boston city councilor. He had affiliated and drilled in the Commonwealth's militia service with the 8th Massachusetts Militia Regiment as one of the regiment's field officers, and commanded the 8th Massachusetts during its three months' service from April to July 1861. Lieutenant Colonel Devereux had also mobilized with Hincks as commander of the regiment's Company J, which had historically been the Salem Light Infantry but Devereux had outfitted and trained as the Salem Zouaves. The same order that assigned Hincks as the colonel, also named the 19th as "the proper rendezvous for all members of the Eighth Regiment desirous of again enlisting in the service of the country."

Hincks and Devereux were both experienced militia officers who had already seen service when the 8th Massachusetts had been mobilized for 90-days service in April 1861. The 8th had earned a good reputation for discipline, drill , and ability. Deverux's company of Salem Zouaves had a reputation as one of the best drilled companies in the Commonwealth.  The 8th had mustered out on July 29 and Hincks, Devereux, and the Salem Zouaves re-enlisted upon their return and immediately reported to the training camp in Lynnfield. The injection of Devereux and his Zouaves into the regiment led many to realize their prior training had been inadequate. Hincks and Devereux remedied the situation by assigning a Salem Zouave to each company as the drill sergeant. The non-commissioned officers (NCOs) from this company also were commissioned and assigned to each company. By the end of their time in Lynnfield, every company in the regiment had officers and NCOs who had served 90-day service in the 8th Massachusetts Militia's Salem Zouaves.

In the camp, the regiment turned in most of their Windsor, Vermont produced Model 1841s and received the Model 1856 Enfield Rifle. Also known as "the 2-band Enfield" and "Sergeants' Rifle," it was the rifle thst the British army issued ti its rifle regiments and to sergeants in its line battalions. A handful of the Model 1841s that were in excellent condition and had been modified to .58 caliber and with rear sights and bayonets were retained, but most of the men received the new rifles and were impressed with them.

Due to a lack of personnel and infrastructure ready when the war began, the federal government left the recruiting, equipping, and providing of recruits to the states with reimbursement to come from the federal level upon muster into federal service. Since the states were handling the process, existing militia companies building to full-strength followed the existing militia practice of voting in new recruits which made recruitment slower than the new volunteer companies in the regiment. The recruiting for the militia companies nd the nw volunteer companies were working slowly when the defeat at Bull Run shook Washington, DC. In response, on July 22, Lincoln authorized the call-up of 500,000 more three-year enlistments. The debacle spurred the  The next day, the Secretary of War issued a call for all available regiments and detachments to be hurried forward at once.

The The salting of the regiment's companies with Salem Zouaves and other veterans of the Eighth injected a new vim and vigor into recruitment and training. The capable veterans brought a renewed sense of purpose and ramped up the training with the all field officers receiving their commissions by August 3 and the last of the staff and line officers on August 22. Despite still lacking its full paper strength, the regiment mustered into Federal service for a three-year enlistment on August 28, 1861, under the command of Colonel Hinks. The plan was to continue recruiting to bring the regiment up to strength in Massachusetts and send the recruits on in groups of drafts.

Deployment
The regiment learned that it would be joining the Army of the Potomac and spend the next two days in transit via Boston, Fall River, New York, Philadelphia, and Baltimore, to reach New Jersey Avenue Station in Washington, DC

Transit
At 15:00, Wednesday, August 28, the regiment was formed in line at Camp Schouler in Lynnfield, received its State Colors, and boarded the train on the waiting at the side of the camp. The train traveled through Salem and Lynn, arriving at North Station at 17:15. The arrival was a novel experience to many members of the regiment from the small towns in Essex and Middlesex who had never been to Boston before. The 19th marched to Boston Common where a brief farewell from the governor and state officials was given, and they had a brief meal. After an hour, it left and arrived 19:30 at the Old Colony depot joined by the 17th Massachusetts where it boarded a Fall River Line train which would take them to a Fall River Line boat for New York.

The steam ship from Fall River entered New York Harbor on Thursday morning, August 29, went up the Hudson, and disembarked on Manhattan at 13:00. It marched to the 7th New York barracks at City Hall, where it was fed in its mess, and the enlisted men received a few hours in the afternoon to see the sights. In the early evening, they marched up Broadway, through Canal to Vestry Street, to Pier 39, and went on board the Ferry boat John Potter, of the Camden and Amboy Line. Once across the Hudson in Perth Amboy, the 19th and 17th boarded the Pennsylvania Railroad train for Washington.

At 03:30 on Friday, the train carrying the two regiments stopped in Philadelphia where they received an early morning breakfast from supportive local citizens. After two hours, they were back onboard the train and arrived in Baltimore at the  Philadelphia, Wilmington and Baltimore Railroad's President Street Station midmorning. 

Due to a thirty-year-old ordinance banning steam engines operating in the city, there was no direct steam rail connection between President Street Station and the Baltimore and Ohio Railroad's Camden Station.  Rail cars that transferred between the two stations had to be pulled by horses along Pratt Street down ten blocks to the southwest to Camden Yards. Union troops marched down Pratt to the other station. It in this transfer on April 19, as the 6th Massachusetts transferred between stations, a mob of anti-war supporters and Southern sympathizers attacked the train cars and blocked the route. When it became apparent that they could travel by horse no further, the four companies, about 240 soldiers, got out of the cars and marched in formation down Pratt Street where they were attacked by the mob and opened fire in response.

As a result, units got off the train immediately upon arrival at President Street, and marched under arms down Pratt Street the ten-block distance to Casmden Yards. The horse-drawn rail cars only carried equipment under guard. The 19th was well aware of the large minority of southern sympathizers and also that despite the majority remaining unionist, it was also a slave state. As they began marching, they were aware of the noticeabley cold reception and glares from some of the local citizens. As the 19th and 17th turned left down Howard Street, they noticed the roof of Camden Yards filled with bullet holes from the riot of April 19. 

Onboard a steam train again, the men soon pulled out of Camden Yards bound for Washington. This was the first time many of the men saw slaves working in fields as they passed by on the train. They also duly noted soldiers on guard duty all along the rail line between Baltimore and Washington, and for the first time saw the meting out of military punishment. The trip from Baltimore to Washington was long and tedious with continual side-tracking to yield to regular, scheduled passenger service.

In Washington
At midnight Friday, August 30, 1861, the 19th arrived at Union Station, and marched into halted at Soldiers' Rest. The regiment stood in formation under arms until a Pennsylvania regiment that had arrived just before them finished supper. The men were served a ""very bad"" meal of "mouldy soft bread, boiled salt pork and very poor coffee." In response, COL Hincks made "a vigorous protest" to the officer-in-charge giving "him religious instructions."

Since the Pennsylvania regiment had taken the barracks billeting, the 19th slept outside on the ground, luckily on a warm night, until disturbed  around 04:00 by a grazing herd of hogs. The next morning when the 19th marched in to breakfast, they found that Hincks' "draft had been honored," and received "a more respectable meal." This was a portend of the life to come in the Army, and some of the older men were already finding their patriotic ardor fading.

During the afternoon, the regiment slung knapsacks and marched down  Pennsylvania Avenue three miles to their new  campground on Meridian Hill. The 19th set up its regimental camp there, and saw the sixteen wagons it brought with it from Camp Schouler exchanged for eleven standard issue army wagons. The fact that some of the officers and men had served in the 8th Massachusetts previously proved a great advantage, as COL Hinks began a rigid training/drill regimen that would remain routine as long as he commanded the 19th. As active drilling began in earnest, Hincks divided the field officers' duties. Hincks ran battalion drills, LTC Devereaux the manual of arms, and MAJ Howe taught camp and regimental guard/security. Since many of these veterans already had many connections among the military officials at the Capitol and throughout the District, the 19th received better logistical support than otherwise would have been the case. Encamped on the hillside, the men found battalion drill very hard, yet "from early morn till dewy eve" they went through their paces. This was done Monday through Saturday, and on Sundays, the men marched out by companies, seated in the shade, and learned the Articles of War from the officers.

At Meridian Hill, the regiment began to take on the look and air of soldiers, not knowing  the future worth of all the drills, fatigues, and labors that griped about daily. This would continue for the next two weeks. While at the hill, the regiment's camp was across on the street from that of the 7th Michigan, and many close friendships immediately sprang up between the men of the two regiments, which lasted during the entire service of the regiments.

1861 Operations along the Potomac

On September 13, the men received word that they were assigned to brigade of BGEN Frederick W Lander and ordered to march to Poolesville, Md., then the headquarters of that division, known as the "Corps of Observation," commanded by BGEN  Charles P Stone. Some of the older men who had been in the militia found the first real march of a substantial distance quite difiicult where some of the younger men "fresh from school or indoor life, could endure more than the men of mature years who had at first laughed at them." The route on that day passed through Leesboro and Rockville. Just before we arriving at Rockville, the men received ten rounds of ammunition and ordered to "Load at will." With the earlier service of the men in the 8th, and the 19th's passage through Baltimore in mind, they had been warned to be wary of Rockville's strong secession sentiment, but passed through without incident. Before dusk, the regiment stopped for the night by a stream in Darnestown that fed into the Potomac.

The next day, Saturday, September 14, they joined their brigade at Poolesville in the evening, greeted by the men of the 15th Massachusetts, who had prepared supper and coffee for them upon arrival. This act was greatly appreciated and formed the basis a solid bond between the two regiments, which lasted throughout the war. The next day, Sunday, September 15, they marched two miles out of Poolesville to Camp Benton near Edward's Ferry on the Potomac, which was to be their home for several months.

At the camp, which was on a plain, drill and instruction continued from morning until night, interspersed at intervals with picket duty. In a short time, the ability and experience of Hincks, Devereux, Howe, and the cadre from the Salem Zouaves led to a high state of discipline that attracted onlookers from other states' regiments who would surround the guard lines at drill and watch the manoeuvres taking notes. The afternoon battalion movement drills, rigid discipline on guard duty, and the wearing of newly issued dress coats with brass shoulder scales and leather neck stocks led other men to refer to the regiment as "The Nineteenth Regulars." The men took this nickname with pride, finding their unit noticeably different from other regiments being commended by their superiors for their performance. The surgeon, Dr. Dyer, wrote home:

External links
 19th Massachusetts Infantry monument at Gettysburg Battlefield

Military units and formations established in 1861
Military units and formations disestablished in 1865
Units and formations of the Union Army from Massachusetts